Żurawice may refer to the following places in Poland:
Żurawice, Lower Silesian Voivodeship (south-west Poland)
Żurawice, Kuyavian-Pomeranian Voivodeship (north-central Poland)